The Little Clyde River is a river in the municipality of Lanark Highlands, Lanark County in Eastern Ontario, Canada. It is in the Saint Lawrence River drainage basin, is a right tributary of the Clyde River, and was named after the River Clyde in Scotland.

Course
The Little Clyde River begins at the outflow from Tate Lake in geographic Dalhousie Township. It flows east, then turns northeast, passes the community of Poland, enters geographic Lanark Township, and reaches its mouth at the Clyde River. The Clyde River flows via the Mississippi River and the Ottawa River to the Saint Lawrence River.

Tributaries
Gunns Creek (right)
Poland Creek (right)
Wilsons Creek (right)

References

Sources

See also
List of rivers of Ontario

Rivers of Lanark County